Shaun Curry (5 June 1937 - 7 July 2009) was a British actor, best known for his appearances on television.

His credits include: Z-Cars, The Saint, Warship, The Sweeney, The New Avengers, Secret Army, Poldark, To the Manor Born, The Professionals, Blake's 7, Fox, Hot Money, Minder, The Gentle Touch, The Bill, Grange Hill, Just Good Friends, London's Burning  and Holby City.

Educated in part at Buckingham College, Harrow, Served in the Grenadier Guards.

Graduating from RADA in 1961, his theatre roles included work in rep, with the RSC, in the West End, and with the National Theatre.

Selected filmography
 Death Is a Woman (1966) - Joe
 Up the Junction (1968) - Ted
 Nobody Runs Forever (1968) - Reporter (uncredited)
 The Fiction Makers (1968) - Guard, Gamekeeper
 The Last Shot You Hear (1969) - Driver
 The Spy's Wife (1972) - Chauffeur
 From Beyond the Grave (1974) - 1st Workman (segment 4 "The Door") (uncredited)
 A Bridge Too Far (1977) - Corporal Robbins
 Let's Get Laid (1978) - Greenleaf
 The Empire Strikes Back (1980) - Hoth Rebel Commander (uncredited)
 The Guns and the Fury (1981) - Major Wayne-Smith
 The Year of the Bodyguard (1982) - Interviewed policeman
 The Doctor and the Devils (1985) - Policeman

References

External links
 

British male stage actors
British male television actors
1937 births
2009 deaths
Alumni of RADA